The 1957–58 Hong Kong First Division League season was the 47th since its establishment.

League table

References
1957–58  Hong Kong First Division table (RSSSF)

Hong Kong First Division League seasons
Hong
football